Beykeyevo (Bäykey) is a rural locality (a village) in Starokurmashevsky Selsoviet, Kushnarenkovsky District, Bashkortostan, Russia. The population was 170 as of 2010. There are 3 streets.

Geography 
Beykeyevo is located 28 km southwest of Kushnarenkovo (the district's administrative centre) by road. Verkhnesaitovo is the nearest rural locality.

References 

Rural localities in Kushnarenkovsky District